St Paul's Church and Centre is a Parish Church in the Church of England  Diocese of Sheffield located at the junction of Norton Lees Lane and Angerford Avenue, just above Meersbrook Park.

Originally built between 1875 and 1877, St Paul's was much altered to meet the needs of an expanding congregation in 1935 when C. B. Flockton added broad North and South aisles. The recent phase of redevelopment, 2006–7, has just been completed. The church pews have been removed and replaced with modern chairs, and other rooms, such as the vestry, have been modernised for use as community rooms.

External links
Official website

Churches completed in 1877
19th-century Church of England church buildings
Paul, Norton Lees
Sheffield, St Paul's Church
1877 establishments in England